Eurycnemus is a genus of European non-biting midges in the subfamily Orthocladiinae of the bloodworm family (Chironomidae).

References

External links 
 

Chironomidae
Nematocera genera